Qaemabad or Ghaemabad or Qaimabad or Qayemabad may refer to:
 Qaemabad, Ardabil
 Qaemabad, Isfahan
 Qaemabad, Kerman
 Qaemabad, Arzuiyeh, Kerman Province
 Qaemabad, Narmashir, Kerman Province
 Qaemabad, Sistan and Baluchestan
 Qaemabad, South Khorasan
 Qaemabad, alternate name for Kalateh-ye Mir, South Khorasan
 Qaemabad-e Razzaqzadeh, South Khorasan
 Qaemabad Rural District (disambiguation)